The Play In Challenger is a professional tennis tournament played on indoor hard courts. It is currently part of the ATP Challenger Tour. It will be held annually in Lille, France. Its predecessor is the Open du Nord, a tournament that has been part of the ITF Men's Circuit from 2002 until 2017.

Past finals

Singles

Doubles

References

External links
Official website
ITF Search

ATP Challenger Tour
Hard court tennis tournaments
Tennis tournaments in France
Recurring sporting events established in 2018
2018 establishments in France